Graham Hamond was a Royal Navy officer.

Graham or Graeme Ham(m)ond may also refer to:

Graeme Hammond, American neurologist and sportsman
Sir Graham Hamond-Graeme, 4th Baronet (1845–1920), of the Hamond-Graeme baronets

See also
Graham Hammonds, singer